Kouekong Stadium is a multi-purpose stadium in Kouekong, a suburb of Bafoussam, Cameroon. It is used mostly for football matches and it also has athletics facilities.  The stadium has seats for 20,000 people. It was built in 2015 and inaugurated on April 30, 2016.
The stadium also hosted some matches of the 2021 Africa Cup of Nations.

References 

Sports venues completed in 2016

Athletics (track and field) venues in Cameroon
Cameroon
Multi-purpose stadiums in Cameroon
Football venues in Cameroon